André Schwarz-Bart (May 23, 1928, Metz, Moselle - September 30, 2006, Pointe-à-Pitre, Guadeloupe) was a French novelist of Polish-Jewish origins. He was awarded the 1967 Jerusalem Prize.

Biography
Schwarz-Bart's parents moved to France in 1924, a few years before he was born. His first language was Yiddish and he learned to speak French on the street and in public school. In 1941 his parents were deported to Auschwitz. Soon after, Schwarz-Bart, still a young teen, joined the Resistance. It was his experiences as a Jew during the war that later prompted him to write his major work, chronicling Jewish history through the eyes of a wounded survivor.

He spent his final years in Guadeloupe, with his wife, the novelist Simone Schwarz-Bart, whose parents were natives of the island. The two co-wrote the book Un plat de porc aux bananes vertes (1967). It is also suggested that his wife collaborated with him on A Woman Named Solitude. The two were awarded the Prix Carbet de la Caraïbe et du Tout-Monde in 2008 for their lifetime of literary work.

He is best known for his novel Le Dernier des justes (translated into English as The Last of the Just). The book, which traces the story of a Jewish family from the time of the Crusades to the gas chambers of Auschwitz, earned Schwarz-Bart the Prix Goncourt in 1959. He won the Jerusalem Prize in 1967.

He died of complications after heart surgery in 2006.

One of his two sons with his wife Simone Schwartz-Bart is Jacques Schwarz-Bart, a noted jazz saxophonist.

Bibliography
 (1959) Le Dernier des Justes; published in English translation as The Last of the Just (1960)
 (1967) Un plat de porc aux bananes vertes, with Simone Schwarz-Bart. This work has not been published in English but a literal translation of the title would be "A plate of pork with green bananas".
 (1972) ; published in English as A Woman Named Solitude (1973)
 (1989) Hommage à la femme noire in collaboration with Simone Schwarz-Bart; Published in English as In Praise of Black Women (2001)
 (2009) L'étoile du matin; published in English as The Morning Star (2011)

Notes

References
Hunter, Michelle (2000) Simone Schwarz-Bart

External links
 Obituary in the International Herald Tribune

1928 births
2006 deaths
Writers from Metz
20th-century French Jews
French people of Polish-Jewish descent
20th-century French novelists
21st-century French novelists
Jewish novelists
Jewish French writers
Jerusalem Prize recipients
Prix Goncourt winners
French male novelists
20th-century French male writers
21st-century French male writers